Paeonia rockii, or Rock's peony, is a woody species of tree peony that was named after Joseph Rock. It is one of several species given the vernacular name tree peony, and is native to the mountains of Gansu and adjoining provinces in China.

Uses
Paeonia rockii is cultivated as an ornamental plant in Asia and the west. Like Paeonia lactiflora, another Chinese peony species, it is used as an herbal remedy in traditional Chinese medicine.

Features
Paeonia rockii is known for the obvious black, purple, and brown-red spots at the base of petals. Its main features are:

 Big and bright flower, the diameter can reach .
 Strong fragrance; the smell of one open flower can dominate that of ten other open flowers from another peony.
 Resistance to drought and frost; tolerance of salt and base.

Rockii hybrids
Tree peony hybrids with Paeonia rockii as one parent are called Rockii hybrids. In China there are several cultivar groups of these hybrids, called Gansu Mudan and Zhongyuan Mudan, or North-West Chinese cultivar group. The European-grown Suffruticosa Group (Paeonia × suffruticosa) also belongs here.

References

External links

rockii
Garden plants
Medicinal plants
Endemic flora of China